Tafara Chingwara (born 12 December 1987) is a Zimbabwean cricketer. He made his first-class debut for Mid West Rhinos in the 2016–17 Logan Cup on 6 May 2017. In December 2020, he was selected to play for the Rhinos in the 2020–21 Logan Cup.

References

External links
 

1987 births
Living people
Zimbabwean cricketers
Mid West Rhinos cricketers
Place of birth missing (living people)